Natacha Ngoye Akamabi (born 15 August 1993 in Pointe-Noire) is a sprinter from the Republic of the Congo. She won two gold medals at the 2017 Jeux de la Francophonie. She also represented her country in the 400 metres at the 2012 World Indoor Championships without advancing from the first round.

She qualified to represent Congo at the 2020 Summer Olympics.

International competitions

1Did not finish in the semifinals

Personal bests

Outdoor
100 metres – 11.41 (-1.4 m/s, Yaoundé 2019)
200 metres – 23.04 (+1.0 m/s, Yaoundé 2019)
400 metres – 54.31 (Porto Novo 2012)

Indoor
400 metres – 58.21 (Istanbul 2012)

References

1993 births
Living people
Republic of the Congo female sprinters
Athletes (track and field) at the 2011 All-Africa Games
Athletes (track and field) at the 2015 African Games
Athletes (track and field) at the 2019 African Games
African Games competitors for the Republic of the Congo
Athletes (track and field) at the 2020 Summer Olympics
Olympic female sprinters
Olympic athletes of the Republic of the Congo